Wenke is a surname. Notable people with the surname include:

Ad Wenke (1898–1961), American footballer and state supreme court justice
Klaus Wenke (1916–1944), German naval officer in WW2

Other
Wenke is an alternative spelling of the Norwegian given name Wenche.

German-language surnames